The 2018 FINA Women's Water Polo World League was the 15th edition of the annual women's international water polo tournament. It was played between November 2017 and June 2018 and open to all women's water polo national teams. After participating in a preliminary round, eight teams qualified to play in a final tournament, called the Super Final from 28 May to 2 June 2018.

In the world league, there are specific rules that do not allow matches to end in a draw. If teams are level at the end of the 4th quarter of any world league match, the match will be decided by a penalty shootout. Teams earn points in the standings in group matches as follows:
 Match won in normal time - 3 points
 Match won in shootout - 2 points
 Match lost in shootout - 1 point
 Match lost in normal time - 0 points

Europe 
 November 21, 2017 – May 1, 2018

Inter-Continental Cup 
 April 3–8, 2018, Auckland, New Zealand

Group A

Group B 

5th–8th place bracket 

Championship bracket

Final ranking

Super Final
May 28 – June 2, 2018, Kunshan, China
In the Super Final the eight qualifying teams are split into two groups of four teams with all teams progressing to the knock-out stage.

Qualified teams

Seeding

Preliminary round

Group A
All times are CST (UTC+8)

Group B
All times are CST (UTC+8)

Final round
5th–8th place bracket

5th–8th place classification
 
All times are CST (UTC+8)

7th place match

All times are CST (UTC+8)

5th place match

All times are CST (UTC+8)

Championship bracket

Quarterfinals
 
All times are CST (UTC+8)

Semifinals
 
All times are CST (UTC+8)

Bronze medal match
 
All times are CST (UTC+8)

Gold medal match

All times are CST (UTC+8)

Final ranking

Team Roster
Ashleigh Johnson, Brigitta Games, Melissa Seidemann, Rachel Fattal, Paige Hauschild, Maggie Steffens (C), Kaleigh Gilchrist, Kiley Neushul, Aria Fischer, Jamie Neushul, Stephania Haralabidis, Alys Williams, Gabby Stone. Head coach: Adam Krikorian.

Individual awards

Most Valuable Player

Best Goalkeeper

Top Scorer
 — 15 goals

Notes

References

 Rules & Regulations

World League, women
FINA Women's Water Polo World League
International water polo competitions hosted by China